Day by Day is the fourth extended play by South Korean girl group T-ara, released on July 3, 2012, by Core Contents Media. The album marked the first appearance of the group's eighth member, Areum, and the last appearance of member Ryu  Hwayoung. A repackaged version of the EP, titled Mirage, was released on September 4, 2012. "Sexy Love" was released as the lead single from the Mirage repackage.

Background and release

Day by Day 
On June 13, 2012, Core Contents Media announced that the group would be releasing a new EP entitled Day by Day on July 3. The EP marked the debut of T-ara's eighth member, Areum. Both the EP and its title track were released on July 3.

"Day by Day" was written by Kim Tae-Hyun and produced by Cho Young-soo and Ahn Young-min, who have all previously worked with T-ara on songs such as "Cry Cry" and "Neo Ttaemune Michyeo".  Before its official release, a choreography video in which "Day by Day" can be heard in was leaked onto YouTube in late May 2012. The music video for "Day by Day" was directed by Cha Eun-taek in Seoul, South Korea. It was announced on June 12, 2012, as a 20-minute music video drama starring the group themselves in a science-fiction setting; reminiscent of the movie Mad Max. A large amount of work was needed to complete the computer graphics featured in the video, which caused its release to be delayed by 13 hours. The second part of the music video was released in August, 2012.The music video was included in "Top 5 Music Videos of the Week" list by Stereogum.

Mirage 
A repackaged version of the EP, titled Mirage, was released on September 4, 2012. It contained two additional tracks, the singles "Sexy Love" and "Day and Night (Love All)" (낮과 밤; Najgwa Bam).

Japanese version 
A Japanese version of "Day by Day" was digitally released on September 26, 2012, and was included as a B-side on their fifth Japanese single, a Japanese version of "Sexy Love".

Commercial performance 
"Day by Day" reached number two on the Gaon Weekly Digital Singles Chart and the Billboard Korea K-Pop Hot 100. The song ranked among the best selling singles of the year with nearly 2,150,000 copies sold in South Korea alone by the end of 2012.

"Sexy Love" was also a commercial success peaking at number three on Billboard Korea Hot 100 songs chart and selling nearly 1,550,000 in 2012.

The Japanese version of "Day by Day" peaked at 16 on Billboard Japan Hot 100 singles chart and number 3 on the USEN weekly singles chart.

Track listing

Mirage 

Note: Love All only included on physical release only.

Charts

Day by Day

Mirage

Singles

Sales

Release history

References

2012 EPs
T-ara albums
Korean-language EPs
Kakao M EPs